Malik Terrell Jefferson (born November 15, 1996) is an American football linebacker for the Dallas Cowboys of the National Football League (NFL). He played college football at Texas. As a senior at Poteet High School in Mesquite, Texas, Jefferson won the 2014 Butkus Award given to the best linebacker in high school. He has been a member of the Cincinnati Bengals, Cleveland Browns, Los Angeles Chargers, and Tennessee Titans of the National Football League (NFL).

High school career 
A native of Mesquite, Texas, Jefferson attended Poteet High School where he played football and baseball and competed in track and field. Playing defensive back as a sophomore in 2012, Jefferson registered 105 tackles, 24 tackles for loss, seven sacks, five forced fumbles, and four blocked kicks. Helping Poteet to an 11–3 record, including a 5–2 district mark and a UIL playoff berth, Jefferson was named Sophomore of the Year in District 10–4A and earned first-team All-Area honors by the Dallas Morning News. Poteet advanced to the 4A Division 2 quarterfinals, where they lost 21–13 to Daeshon Hall's Lancaster. In his junior year, Jefferson mostly played linebacker and was part of a defense that held nine opponents to 20 points or fewer. He tallied 93 tackles, 18 tackles for loss, 14 sacks, three forced fumbles, and three fumble recoveries, and was chosen Defensive MVP and first-team All-District 10–4A. Jefferson was also an honorable mention on the 4A All-State team by the Associated Press and Texas Sports Writers Association. Poteet finished the season with a 12–2 record, including a 6–1 district mark and an appearance in the 4A Division 2 quarterfinals, where they lost 43–14 to Terence Williams' Ennis. MaxPreps named Jefferson to their 2013 Junior All-American team.

After participating in Nike's 2014 The Opening in Eugene, Oregon, Jefferson started his senior season as preseason Defensive Player of the Year by Dave Campbell's Texas Football. He was credited with 81 tackles on the season, including six sacks and 16 tackles for loss, along with two forced fumbles and four blocked kicks, despite missing more than two games due to injury, along with three other second halves where the starters were removed. Poteet went undefeated 7–0 through its district schedule and finished the season 10–2, but was upset 27–24 in the 5A Division 2 area playoffs by The Colony. Jefferson was named first-team All-American by Parade and USA Today, and also won the High School Butkus Award for the nation's top linebacker. After season, he participated in the 2015 Under Armour All-America Game.

Regarded as a five-star recruit by both Rivals.com and Scout.com, either recruiting service also ranked him the No. 1 outside linebacker prospect of his class. With offers from every major program in the country, Jefferson narrowed his selection down to Baylor, Louisiana State, Texas, Texas A&M, and UCLA. On December 19, 2014, he committed to play football at University of Texas at Austin, and was labelled as Charlie Strong's “signature recruit.” He was an early enrollee arriving on campus in January 2015.

College career 
Jefferson played as a true freshman at Texas, and was named a Freshman All-American by Sporting News, and USA Today. Jefferson was also awarded as The Big 12 Conference Freshman Defensive Player of the Year for the 2015 season. On December 31, 2017, Jefferson declared his intentions to enter the 2018 NFL Draft.

Professional career
On December 31, 2017, Jefferson released a statement through The Player's Tribune announcing his decision to forgo his remaining eligibility and enter the 2018 NFL Draft. Jefferson ignored recommendations from the College Advisory Board to return to college and chose to enter the draft instead. He attended the NFL Scouting Combine in Indianapolis and completed the majority of drills, but opted to skip the three-cone drill and short shuttle. On March 28, 2018, he participated at Texas' pro day and performed the vertical jump (37"), short shuttle, and three-cone drill. At the conclusion of the pre-draft process, Jefferson was projected to be a second-round pick by NFL draft experts and scouts. He was ranked the second-best inside linebacker prospect in the draft by DraftScouts.com and was ranked the eighth-best linebacker by Scouts Inc. and Sports Illustrated.

Cincinnati Bengals
The Cincinnati Bengals selected Jefferson in the third round (78th overall) of the 2018 NFL Draft. Jefferson was the 11th linebacker drafted in 2018.

On June 21, 2018, the Cincinnati Bengals signed Jefferson to a four-year, $3.59 million contract that includes a signing bonus of $923,728. He played in 10 games before being placed on injured reserve on December 18, 2018 with a foot injury.

Jefferson was waived during final roster cuts on August 31, 2019.

Cleveland Browns
Jefferson was claimed off waivers by the Cleveland Browns on September 1, 2019. On November 12, 2019, Jefferson was waived by the Browns.

Los Angeles Chargers
On November 25, 2019, Jefferson was signed to the Los Angeles Chargers practice squad. He signed a futures contract with the Chargers on December 30, 2019.

On September 5, 2020, Jefferson was waived by the Chargers.

Tennessee Titans
On September 9, 2020, Jefferson was signed to the Tennessee Titans practice squad, but was released five days later.

Los Angeles Chargers (second stint)
On September 16, 2020, Jefferson was signed to the Los Angeles Chargers practice squad. He was promoted to the active roster on September 26, 2020. On January 1, 2021, Jefferson was placed on injured reserve. He was waived after the season on March 12, 2021.

Indianapolis Colts
On May 5, 2021, Jefferson signed with the Indianapolis Colts. He was waived on August 31, 2021 and re-signed to the practice squad the next day. He was promoted to the active roster on December 15. He was waived on January 4, 2022. He signed a reserve/future contract on January 10, 2022. He was released on May 10, 2022.

Dallas Cowboys
On July 14, 2022, Jefferson signed with the Dallas Cowboys. He was waived on August 30, 2022 and signed to the practice squad the next day.

References

External links 
 
 Texas Longhorns bio

1996 births
Living people
American football linebackers
Cincinnati Bengals players
Cleveland Browns players
Dallas Cowboys players
Indianapolis Colts players
Los Angeles Chargers players
People from Mesquite, Texas
Players of American football from Texas
Sportspeople from the Dallas–Fort Worth metroplex
Tennessee Titans players
Texas Longhorns football players
African-American players of American football
21st-century African-American sportspeople